Irina Turundayevskaya (born 4 February 1947) is a Soviet alpine skier. She competed in two events at the 1968 Winter Olympics.

References

1947 births
Living people
Soviet female alpine skiers
Olympic alpine skiers of the Soviet Union
Alpine skiers at the 1968 Winter Olympics
Sportspeople from Saint Petersburg